In geology, mineralogy, and petrology, a bleb is a small bubble-like inclusion of one mineral within a larger mineral. An example is a bleb of sylvite within chlorite. Blebs tend to be brightly coloured.

References 
Kamenetsky VS et al. Chloride and carbonate immiscible liquids at the closure of the kimberlite magma evolution (Udachnaya-East kimberlite, Siberia) Chemical Geology, Volume 237, Issues 3-4, 5 March 2007, Pages 384-400 DOI: 10.1016/j.chemgeo.2006.07.010

Mineralogy